Lake Washington is a lake bordering Seattle.

Lake Washington or Washington Lake may also refer to:

Lakes in the United States
 Washington Lake (California), Sacramento, California
 Lake Washington (Florida), a lake at Melbourne, Florida
 Washington Lake (Idaho), a lake in the White Cloud Mountains
 Lake Washington (Le Sueur and Blue Earth counties, Minnesota)
 Lake Washington (Meeker County, Minnesota)
 Washington Lake (Sibley County, Minnesota)
 Lake Washington (Mississippi), a lake in Washington County
 Lake Washington (New York), main reservoir for the city of Newburgh, New York
 Lake Washington (Providence County, Rhode Island), lake in Glocester, Rhode Island

Other places
 Washington Lake, a freshwater lake of Teraina (also known as Washington Island), Kiribati
 Washington Lake Township, Sibley County, Minnesota, a township

See also
 Lake Washington Boulevard, a scenic route in Seattle that hugs Lake Washington
 Lake Washington Technical College
 Lake Washington Floating Bridge (disambiguation)